The Arrernte land is aboriginal land in central Australia. It is controlled by Arrernte Council which in turn is controlled by Central Land Council from Alice Springs.

Description

Arrernte is the traditional language of Alice Springs, which is the centre of Arrernte land.

Arrernte land claims run as far west as Mutitjulu and King's Canyon, and as far east as the western edge of the Simpson Desert.  Arrernte does control a small amount of land north of Alice Springs, but there are no communities on this land.

Alice Springs
Arrernte